Ethylbenzene is an organic compound with the formula . It is a highly flammable, colorless liquid with an odor similar to that of gasoline. This monocyclic aromatic hydrocarbon is important in the petrochemical industry as an reaction intermediate in the production of styrene, the precursor to polystyrene, a common plastic material.  In 2012, more than 99% of ethylbenzene produced was consumed in the production of styrene.

Occurrence and applications
Ethylbenzene occurs naturally in coal tar and petroleum.

The dominant application of ethylbenzene is its role as an intermediate in the production of polystyrene.  Catalytic dehydrogenation of ethylbenzene gives hydrogen and styrene:
  →  C6H5CH=CH2  +  

As of May 2012, more than 99% of all the ethylbenzene produced is used for this purpose.

Ethylbenzene hydroperoxide, a reagent and radical initiator, is produced by autoxidation of ethylbenzene:
C6H5CH2CH3 + O2 → C6H5CH(O2H)CH3

Niche uses
Ethylbenzene is added to gasoline as an anti-knock agent to reduce engine knocking and increase the octane rating. Ethylbenzene is often found in other products, including pesticides, cellulose acetate, synthetic rubber, paints, and inks. Used in the recovery of natural gas, ethylbenzene may be injected into the ground.

Production
Ethylbenzene is produced on a large scale by combining benzene and ethene in an acid-catalyzed chemical reaction:

 +  →  
In 2012, more than 99% of ethylbenzene was produced in this way. Thus, makers of ethylbenzene are the major buyers of benzene, claiming more than half of total output.

Small amounts of ethylbenzene are recovered from the mix of xylenes by superfractioning, an extension of the distillation process.

In the 1980s a zeolite-based process using vapor phase alkylation offered a higher purity and yield.  Then a liquid phase process was introduced using zeolite catalysts.  This offers low benzene-to-ethylene ratios, reducing the size of the required equipment and lowering byproduct production.

Industrial accidents
On January 5, 2011 a major fire took place at the Chemie-Pack storage facility in the Dutch Moerdijk industrial area. The fire started in a chemical reactor operated by Shell which overheated due to an exothermal runaway reaction between the metal oxide catalyst and ethylbenzene. Firefighting activities lead to massive environmental pollution. Total damage is estimated at 70 million Euro.

Health effects
The acute toxicity of ethylbenzene is low, with an LD50 of about 4 grams per kilogram of body weight.  The longer term toxicity and carcinogenicity is ambiguous.  Eye and throat sensitivity can occur when high level exposure to ethylbenzene in the air occurs.  At higher level exposure, ethylbenzene can cause dizziness.   Once inside the body, ethylbenzene biodegrades to 1-phenylethanol, acetophenone, phenylglyoxylic acid, mandelic acid, benzoic acid and hippuric acid. Ethylbenzene exposure can be determined by testing for the breakdown products in urine.

As of September 2007, the United States Environmental Protection Agency (EPA) determined that drinking water with a concentration of 30 parts per million (ppm) for one day or 3 ppm for ten days is not expected to have any adverse effect in children.  Lifetime exposure of 0.7 ppm ethylbenzene is not expected to have any adverse effect either.  The U.S. Occupational Safety and Health Administration (OSHA) limits exposure to workers to an average 100 ppm for an 8-hour workday, a 40-hour workweek.

Ethylbenzene is classified as a possible carcinogen by the International Agency for Research on Cancer (IARC) however, the EPA has not determined ethylbenzene to be a carcinogen. The National Toxicology Program conducted an inhalation study in rats and mice. Exposure to ethylbenzene resulted in an increased incidence of kidney and testicular tumors in male rats, and trends of increased kidney tumors in female rats, lung tumors in male mice, and liver tumors in female mice.

As with all organic compounds, ethylbenzene vapors form an explosive mixture with air.  When transporting ethylbenzene, it is classified as a flammable liquid in class 3, Packing Group II.

Environmental effects
Ethylbenzene is found mostly as a vapor in the air since it can easily move from water and soil. A median concentration of 0.62 parts per billion (ppb) was found in urban air in 1999. A study conducted in 2012 found that in-country air the median concentration was found to be 0.01 ppb and indoors the median concentration was 1.0 ppb. It can also be released into the air through the burning of coal, gas, and oil. The use of ethylbenzene in the industry contributes to ethylbenzene vapor in the air.  After about three days in the air with the help of sunlight, other chemicals break down ethylbenzene into chemicals that can be found in smog. Since it does not readily bind to soil it can also easily move into groundwater. In surface water, it breaks down when it reacts with chemicals naturally found in water. Generally, ethylbenzene is not found in drinking water, however it can be found in residential drinking water wells if the wells are near waste sites, underground fuel storage tanks that are leaking, or landfills.

As of 2012, according to the EU Dangerous Substances Directive, ethylbenzene is not classified as hazardous to the environment.

Ethylbenzene is a constituent of tobacco smoke.

Biodegradation
Certain strains of the fungus Cladophialophora can grow on ethylbenzene. The bacterium Aromatoleum aromaticum EbN1 was discovered due to its ability to grow on ethylbenzene.

References

National Toxicology Program. Toxicology and Carcinogenesis Studies of Ethylbenzene (CAS No. 100-41-4) in F344/N Rats and B6C3F1 Mice (Inhalation Studies). TR No. 466. U.S. Department of Health and Human Services, Public Health Service, National Institutes of Health, Bethesda, MD. 1999.

External links
 National Pollutant Inventory - Ethybenzene Fact Sheet
 NLM Hazardous Substances Databank – Ethylbenzene
 EPA Chemical database
 Intox Chemical database
 Agency for Toxic Substances and Disease Registry
 CDC - NIOSH Pocket Guide to Chemical Hazards

Hazardous air pollutants
IARC Group 2B carcinogens
Alkylbenzenes
C2-Benzenes
Commodity chemicals
Phenyl compounds